'''Attaki Model Town''' is a town and neighborhood of Charsadda District in Khyber Pakhtunkhwa province of Pakistan.

References

Union councils of Charsadda District
Populated places in Charsadda District, Pakistan